The 1964–65 Drexel Dragons men's basketball team represented Drexel Institute of Technology during the 1964–65 men's basketball season. The Dragons, led by 13th year head coach Samuel Cozen, played their home games at Sayre High School and were members of the College–Southern division of the Middle Atlantic Conferences (MAC).

The team finished the season 18–4, and finished in 1st place in the MAC in the regular season.

On February 27, 1965, Michael McCurdy set the Drexel team record for most points in a single game, scoring 37 points against Elizabethtown.

Roster

Schedule

|-
!colspan=9 style="background:#F8B800; color:#002663;"| Regular season
|-

|-
!colspan=9 style="background:#F8B800; color:#002663;"| 1965 Middle Atlantic Conference men's basketball tournament

References

Drexel Dragons men's basketball seasons
Drexel
Drexel Drag
Drexel Drag